Phoenix Television is a majority state-owned television network that offers Mandarin and Cantonese-language channels that serve mainland China, Hong Kong, Macau and other markets with substantial Chinese-language viewers. It is operated by Phoenix Satellite Television Holdings Ltd, a television broadcaster with headquarters in Mainland China and Hong Kong. It is also registered in Cayman Islands.

The CEO and founder of Phoenix TV, Liu Changle, was an officer and political instructor in the People's Liberation Army in its 40th Group Army. He later became a journalist for the Chinese Communist Party-controlled China National Radio after the Cultural Revolution and remains well-connected to the Party's leadership. Liu is a standing member of the National Committee of the Chinese People's Political Consultative Conference.

Phoenix Television calls itself a Hong Kong media outlet but holds a non-domestic television programme services license in Hong Kong. Most of the company's customers and non-current assets come from Mainland China. Bauhinia Culture, a company wholly owned by the Chinese government, is its largest shareholder. Freedom House describes Phoenix Television as pro-Beijing. Stephen McDonell of BBC News described the outlet as "sometimes more liberal than its mainland counterparts".

The company's head offices are located in Shenzhen, Guangdong and Tai Po, Hong Kong and it also has correspondent offices in Beijing and Shanghai. The Shenzhen office is said to produce half its TV output.

History 

What eventually became Phoenix Television started as a joint venture between STAR TV in Hong Kong, one private company in China, and China Central Television.

Phoenix Chinese Channel was launched on 31 March 1996. It replaced Star Chinese Channel in Hong Kong and Mainland China.

The Phoenix CNE channel broadcasts in Europe, while the Phoenix North America Chinese Channel goes out in the Americas.  In 2005, a California-based broadcast and engineering director for the channel, Tai Wang Mak, was arrested for conspiring with his brother, Chi Mak, to act as an intelligence agent for China. A 10-year prison sentence was announced in 2008.

On 28 March 2011, Phoenix Television launched Phoenix Hong Kong Channel, broadcasting exclusively in Cantonese.

On 31 March 2011, Phoenix InfoNews Channel was announced as a Peabody Award winner for its "Report on a New Generation of Migrant Workers in China."

In 2011, Phoenix New Media formed a partnership with the BBC to offer the British broadcaster's programming on Phoenix's digital media platforms. This was followed by a similar partnership with the National Film Board of Canada in 2012, under which 130 NFB animated shorts and documentary films would be offered digitally in China.

In October 2013, the 12.15% of shares in Phoenix Television held by 21st Century Fox (through Star) were sold to TPG Capital for HK$1.66 billion (about US$213 million).

In February 2016, Phoenix Television broadcast forced confessions of kidnapped Hong Kong booksellers.

In April 2020, Senator Ted Cruz announced that he would introduce legislation to mandate that the Federal Communications Commission (FCC) revoke the broadcast license of a radio station, XEWW-AM, linked to Phoenix Television, which he claimed to have used radio towers in Mexico to skirt U.S. prohibitions against foreign propaganda dissemination. In June 2020, the FCC ordered XEWW-AM to cease broadcasting.

The Taiwanese government designated Phoenix as a Chinese government-funded company in April 2022, and required the company to end operations in Taiwan.

During the 2022 Russian invasion of Ukraine, a Phoenix TV reporter was one of the only foreign journalists to embed with the Russian military.

Corporate governance

Ownership 
At launch, Star TV and a private sector company in China each owned 45% of the company, and state broadcaster China Central Television owned the remaining 10%.

The original News Corporation's (and subsequently 21st Century Fox's) shares in Phoenix Television held through Star were gradually reduced over the years. Finally, 21st Century Fox sold its shares to TPG Capital in October 2013.

According to the company's 2018 annual report, the company is owned by the following entities:

In April 2021, Liu sold most of his shares to state-owned publisher Bauhinia Culture and Shun Tak Holdings.

Management 
Liu Changle, CEO and founder of Phoenix TV, was a journalist for the Chinese Communist Party-controlled China National Radio after the Cultural Revolution and had become one of China's richest men by the 1990s, being well-connected to the Beijing leadership.

Shuang Liu became COO of Phoenix TV on 17 February 2014. He continues to be the CEO of Phoenix New Media Ltd (NYSE: FENG), a new media company in China.

Former director of Phoenix TV news Chung Pong testified under oath that Phoenix TV news’ programing was  "subject to the dictates of the leadership of the Central Communist Propaganda Department, Central Communist Overseas Propaganda Office, and the Ministry of Foreign Affairs."

References

External links 

Companies listed on the Hong Kong Stock Exchange
Television stations in Hong Kong
Cable television in Hong Kong
Television channels and stations established in 1996
Government-owned companies of China
Chinese propaganda organisations